Pasch may refer to:

 Easter
 Pasch (surname), German and Swedish surname
 Pasch's theorem
 Pasch egg, easter eggs
 Pasch (horse)

See also
 Basch
 Pascha
 Passover